Tubod, officially the Municipality of Tubod (Surigaonon: Lungsod nan Tubod), is a 5th class municipality in the province of Surigao del Norte, Philippines. According to the 2020 census, it has a population of 15,043 people.

History
Tubod was a virgin forest where native inhabitants, the Mamanwa Tribe, had been living. Nomadic in nature, the tribe traveled from the hinterland of Tubod and stayed near riverbanks. Derived from words "Man" - meaning people, and “Banwa,” meaning jungle - A Mamanwa simply means 'a man living in the jungle.'

The tribe still occupies the hinterlands of Tubod particularly in Barangays Cawilan and Motorpool. They are very significant in building homes for the Tuboranons, and the eventual development of municipality. 

Agustin Mendez is recognized as Tubod's Founding Hero and the first Christian settler who discovered the woods. An immigrant from Ubay, Bohol Province, he began to develop Tubod and put the town in the map of Surigao del Norte. It was him who also organized the first Cabeza de Barangay that created the first Sitio.

The Original Tuboranon Cabeza de Barangay founding members were - Agustin Mendez, Donato Pacatang, Florencio Gallenero, Gabriel Sumania, Isaias Calamba, Marciano Dapar, Galanida, Basil, Lumayag and Barro. Mendez led the Cabeza de Barangay bloc and young Galanida was their Secretary. The rest were known as Cabeza Council members.

To create the name for the newly founded Sitio, Mendez commissioned a priest from Carrascal, Surigao del Sur but was not able to come as the means of transportation that time was only through the use of a Kayak to reach Placer, nearest location to Tubod, from Carrascal, then via horses to Barangay Timamana.

However, Tubod Founding Hero Agustin Ganot Mendez did not stop dreaming. He requested and sought service of a clergyman in Jabonga, Agusan del Norte. They cruised along Tubod River to Sabang, Lake Mainit to reach the Sitio and celebrate Tubod's founding.

Christian settlers believed it was important for a First Christian mass to be celebrated during foundation. This was also the day when the new Sitio's name was conceived. Rev. Father Sanidad officiated the first Mass and declared the new sitio after his name “Sitio Union Sanidad” on the 3rd of April.

Sitio Union Sanidad consisted of rough roads and community nipa houses where only a few people settled. Its progress began with Barangay Timamana in Placer, where Agustin Mendez first established residence and cultivated farmlands day in and out. He then later transferred his family to Barangay Poblacion, Tubod.

Later, through an order from constituted authorities, Sitio Union Sanidad was declared independent from Barangay Timamana and was called Barangay Tubod by 1908. 

With Agustin Mendez leading the barangay, he became its First Leader & Originator (Barrio Lieutenant) and named the woods "Tubod" from the local dialect "Tuboran" that meant 'source of water.' 

Barangay Tubod had a population of roughly 100 people, mostly immigrants from Bohol, Cebu, Leyte, Camiguin and Surigao. Its main socio-agricultural sources of income were from abaca, coffee, rice, as well as root crops such as ube, camote and calibre.

As the barangay's progress continued, it became a big source of copra and soon began its own irrigated rice farming.

Barangay Tubod is surrounded by mountainous terrains, hills and the famous Mt. Maniayao standing overlooking the town. With mountain ranges, the presence of natural deposit and mineral resources like gold, silver, copper, chromate and iron are all blessings to the Tuboranons to this day.

Mendez donated two (2) solid wood sculptures of patron saints Peter and Paul, and celebrates their feast day that falls on June 28–29 each year.

Tubod's Founding Hero Agustin Mendez's legacy includes several donations made to the Municipality and Roman Catholic Church settlement.

Recognizing his efforts, a Municipal Resolution in 1989 asserted Agustin “Usting” Mendez as Tuboranon Local Hero for his work including a series of donations from portions of lands that enticed people to live in the municipality.

Politics were also led by Mendez establishing Tubod with appointed and elected officials found in Tubod's Municipal Archives records. 

Tubod was previously part of the Municipality of Mainit, Surigao del Norte. It was created by virtue of Executive Order No. 269 dated September 18, 1957.

Geography

Tubod lies in a valley at the centre of the peninsula that is the mainland portion of Surigao del Norte, with hills and mountains to the east and west of the town.  A natural feature in the western hills is Songkoy Spring, where clear water emerges from the rainforest and collects in a natural pool that is a popular local swimming place.

Rural areas along the valley floor are dominated by agriculture, while the hills are home to coconut plantations, rainforest and gold mining.  To the south of Tubod is Lake Mainit on the border between Surigao del Norte and Agusan del Norte.

The Maharlika Highway runs through the centre of Tubod and links the town with the major center of Surigao City in the north.  The closest airport is in Surigao City which has flights to Cebu and Manila. Ferries at Surigao City connect the mainland with the adjacent islands of Surigao del Norte and the neighbouring province of Southern Leyte.

Climate

Barangays
Tubod is politically subdivided into 9 barangays.
 Capayahan
 Cawilan 
 Del Rosario 
 Marga 
 Motorpool 
 Poblacion (Tubod) 
 San Isidro 
 San Pablo 
 Timamana

Demographics

The Surigaonon language is the common local language, while Cebuano, Filipino, and English are also spoken.

Economy

See also
 Lake Mainit Development Alliance

References

External links

Tubod Profile at PhilAtlas.com
  Tubod Profile at the DTI Cities and Municipalities Competitive Index
Municipal Website Blog of Tubod
[ Philippine Standard Geographic Code]
Philippine Census Information
Local Governance Performance Management System

Municipalities of Surigao del Norte
Establishments by Philippine executive order